Hồ Tuấn Tài (born 16 March 1995) is a Vietnamese footballer who plays as a forward for V-League club Hồ Chí Minh City and Vietnam national football team.

International career

International goals

U-19

U-22

Honours
Sông Lam Nghệ An 
Vietnamese National Cup: 2017
Vietnamese Super Cup: Runner-up: 2018

References

External links

1995 births
Living people
Vietnamese footballers
Association football forwards
V.League 1 players
Song Lam Nghe An FC players
People from Nghệ An province
Vietnam international footballers
Competitors at the 2017 Southeast Asian Games
Southeast Asian Games competitors for Vietnam